The title Lady Douglas has been held by, or attributed to, several notable women, including:

Janet Douglas, Lady Glamis (c.1498-1537)
Lady Margaret Douglas (1515-1578)
Lady Jane Douglas (1698-1753) 
Frances Douglas, Lady Douglas (1750-1817)

See also Douglas-Home